Hyperolius xenorhinus is a species of frog in the family Hyperoliidae.
It is found in Democratic Republic of the Congo and possibly Uganda.
Its natural habitats are subtropical or tropical moist montane forests, rivers, swamps, freshwater marshes, and intermittent freshwater marshes.

References

xenorhinus
Amphibians described in 1972
Taxonomy articles created by Polbot